Rajuri is a village in the Karmala taluka of Solapur district in Maharashtra state, India.

Demographics
Covering  and comprising 721 households at the time of the 2011 census of India, Rajuri had a population of 3173. There were 1649 males and 1524 females, with 337 people being aged six or younger.

References

Villages in Karmala taluka